Dearest is a 2014 Chinese-language film directed by Peter Chan on kidnapping in China, based on a true story, starring Zhao Wei, Huang Bo, Tong Dawei, Hao Lei, Zhang Yi and Zhang Yuqi. It was screened in the Special Presentations section of the 2014 Toronto International Film Festival.

Plot
Following years of unrelenting search, Tian Wenjun (Huang Bo) and ex-wife Lu Xiaojuan (Hao Lei) finally locate their abducted son in a remote village. After the boy is violently taken away from the village, the abductor's widow Li Hongqin (Zhao Wei) — the boy's foster mother — also loses her foster daughter to a state-owned orphanage in Shenzhen. Heartbroken, Li goes on a lone but determined journey to get her daughter back.

Theme songs
 "Qin'ai de Xiaohai" (亲爱的小孩; "Dear Child") sung by cast members Huang, Tong, Zhao, Zhang Yi and Hao. It was originally sung by Su Rui as the theme song of the 1985 film The Unwritten Law.
 "Mei Yi Ci" (每一次; "Every Time") sung by Huang. It was originally sung by Zhang Hongsheng as an insert song in the 1990 TV series Kewang.
 "Yinxing de Chibang" (隐形的翅膀; "Invisible Wings") sung by Huang and parents of missing children. It was originally sung by Angela Chang in her 2006 album Pandora.

Cast
 Zhao Wei
 Huang Bo
 Tong Dawei
 Hao Lei
 Zhang Yi
 Zhang Yuqi
 Zhang Guoqiang
 Zhu Dongxu
 Yi Qing
 Wang Zhifei

Production
Principal photography for Dearest took place in Shenzhen, Guangzhou and Chengde. It began from January 2014 and concluded on 18 April 2014.

Portraying a rural mother, Zhao Wei spoke the Lower Yangtze Mandarin dialect (the predominant dialect in her hometown of Wuhu) rather than Standard Mandarin in the film.

Accolades

See also
 Lost and Love – another film dealing with child kidnapping in China

References

External links
 
 Trailer with English subtitles
 In China, Dad Uses Social Media To Find Missing Boy - the story that the film is based on

Chinese drama films
2014 drama films
Films about child abduction
Films set in China
Films shot in China
Films directed by Peter Chan
2014 films
2010s Mandarin-language films